Thelma Carpenter (4 December 1911 – 1998) was an English billiards and snooker player. She won the Women's Professional Billiards Championship three times, and the Women's Professional Snooker Championship once.

Biography

Carpenter's father, Brodie Carpenter, owned the Solent Cliffs Hotel in Bournemouth, which had two billiard rooms. Thelma Carpenter was educated at home, and never attended school. She met prominent snooker and billiards players including Joe Davis and Clark McConachy when they played exhibition matches at her father's hotel. The hotel was demolished in the 1970s and is now the site of the Bournemouth International Centre, which has hosted professional snooker tournaments.

McConachy, who was later the World Professional Billiards Champion from 1951 until 1968, and Claude Falkiner (twice runner-up in the World Billiards Championship) both provided coaching to Carpenter, as did Welsh champion player Tom Carpenter (no relation).

She won the World Ladies Amateur Billiards Championship three years consecutively, from 1932 to 1934. In 1934, Carpenter resigned from the Women's Billiards Association (WBA) in protest at them not allowing her to play in tournaments with men that the WBA had no jurisdiction over.

From 1936 to 1939 she was runner up to Ruth Harrison three times in four years in the Women's Professional Snooker Championship, and once to Joyce Gardner in the Women's Professional Billiards Championship.

In 1940 she won her first professional world title by beating Ruth Harrison 2184–1641 in the Billiards final, and, the next time the event was held, in 1949, beat Gardner 3120–2518 to retain the title. 1949 also saw Carpenter lose for the fourth time in the Snooker final, this time 15–16 to Agnes Morris.

The 1950 Billiards final featured the same finalists as in 1949, and had the same victor, with Carpenter beating Gardner 1978–1374 to win for a third time. A few days later, Carpenter won the Snooker Championship too, this time beating Agnes Morris 20–10.

Following the cessation of the women's professional snooker and billiards championships after 1950, Carpenter retired from competitive play, as the reigning champion in both events, and later moved to Mudeford.

She was first woman to commentate on billiards for the BBC, and wrote the "Billiards for Women" column in The Billiard Player magazine. She married Jimmy Seeor in 1939, and had one son, who was present for her 1950 Women's Professional Billiards victory and died in 1998.

Titles and achievements

Snooker

Billiards

Notes

References

External links
Big breaks, battles and pneumonia: the unsung story of Thelma Carpenter’s glistening cue-sport career
Lady Champion Gets Good Billiards Tip British Movietone. (Thelma Carpenter takes advice of Welsh expert in Bournemouth practice for coming contest.)
Girl Billiards Champion British Movietone. (Miss Thelma Carpenter, Amateur Billiards champion shows us some trick shots.)

English snooker players
1911 births
1986 deaths
Female snooker players
Female players of English billiards
English players of English billiards
World champions in English billiards
Sportspeople from Bournemouth